Lucas Cunha may refer to:

 Lucas Cunha (footballer, born January 1997), Brazilian football centre-back for Gil Vicente
 Lucas Cunha (footballer, born July 1997), Brazilian football midfielder for Comercial-SP

See also
 Lucas Da Cunha (born 2001), French football attacking midfielder